The communauté de communes des Sources de la Creuse  was located in the Creuse département of the Limousin region of central France. It was created in January 2002. It was merged into the new Haute-Corrèze Communauté in January 2017.

It comprised the following 11 communes:

Beissat
Clairavaux
La Courtine
Féniers
Magnat-l'Étrange
Malleret
Le Mas-d'Artige
Poussanges
Saint-Martial-le-Vieux
Saint-Merd-la-Breuille
Saint-Oradoux-de-Chirouze

See also
Communes of the Creuse department

References  

Sources de la Creuse